Milad Dezful Football Club is an Iranian football club based in Dezful, Iran. They currently compete in the 2011–12 Iran Football's 3rd Division.

Season-by-Season

The table below shows the achievements of the club in various competitions.

See also
 Hazfi Cup
 Iran Football's 3rd Division 2011–12

Football clubs in Iran
Association football clubs established in 2005
2005 establishments in Iran